WDTB-LD, virtual channel 39 (UHF digital channel 18), is a low-powered Daystar owned-and-operated television station licensed to Buffalo, New York, United States. The station is owned by the Word of God Fellowship. The station's signal on channel 40 was inactive/off the air due to a technical conflict with the digital signal of CFTO-TV; Toronto's digital signal also being on channel 40, though it is 65 miles away, but has returned to the air at some point following the Canadian digital transition, on August 31, 2011.

History
The station was granted a broadcast license on May 31, 1989, under the call sign W39BC on channel 39, but did not sign on until 1993. When CBS affiliate  WIVB-TV (channel 4) was granted channel 39 for its digital signal in 1997, W39BC was displaced, but allowed to move to channel 40, and gained the call-sign of WBUF-LP (no relation to the former WBUF-TV or the current WBUF-FM). In 1999, it gained the call sign WDTB-LP.

Daystar purchased WNGS (channel 67) from bankrupt owner, Equity Media Holdings (formerly under a local marketing agreement (LMA) with and operated by Granite Broadcasting). Because Daystar already had WDTB-LP, it chose to sell the station to ITV of Buffalo, LLC, a partnership owned by local TV personalities Philip Arno and Donald Angelo, for $2,750,000, with plans to program the station from Clarence. As of July 2012, Daystar programming is being carried on WBBZ-DT4, as part of the conditions of sale to ITV.

At the same time, Daystar applied to move WDTB-LP's city of license from Hamburg to Buffalo, and to move to channel 28 afterwards, so it no longer conflicts with CFTO-DT (channel 9). This application was dismissed, though the station was later approved for upgrading to digital operations on UHF 29. The station's digital license was issued on December 5, 2016, with the station changing its call sign to WDTB-LD.

On August 13, 2020, WDTB-LP applied to move from UHF 29 to UHF 18, citing interference from CKVP-DT (Channel 29). As of October 13, 2020, the station is dark until the channel reassignment is complete. The station was licensed for channel 18 effective October 28, 2022.

References

External links

Television channels and stations established in 1993
1993 establishments in New York (state)
DTB-LD
Daystar (TV network) affiliates
Low-power television stations in the United States